

Events

January events 
 January –  The American Car and Foundry Company delivers the last passenger car it will build, an R28 (New York City Subway car).
 January 4 – Lokomotivbau Elektrotechnische Werke delivers the first electric locomotives built in the German Democratic Republic to Deutsche Reichsbahn.
 January 16 – Eastern Region of British Railways takes delivery of D9001, the first production "Deltic" class diesel locomotive.

February events 
 February 4 – Lehigh Valley Railroad discontinues its Black Diamond passenger train service.
 February 6 – The first automatic level crossing on British Railways is installed at Spath, Staffordshire.

March events
 March 27 – Black demonstrators stage a "ride-in" on Charleston, South Carolina, streetcars.
 March 28 – Tokyo Metro Hibiya Line opened. The first railway line in the world without any lineside signals.

April events
 April – D5151, the first Sulzer Type 2 diesel locomotive, later British Rail Class 25, is completed at B.R. Darlington Works.
 April 9 – The Long Beach Line, the last operating service of the former Pacific Electric Railway, is replaced by buses.
 April 25 – Osaka Loop Line, circular line system start operation in Japan.

May events
 May 24 – The Milwaukee Road's Olympian Hiawatha passenger train makes its final run between Chicago, Illinois, and Seattle, Washington.
 May 28 – The Orient Express makes its last run between Paris, France, and Bucharest, Romania.

June events
 June – The last of the Bradshaw railway timetables, first published by George Bradshaw in 1839, is published in Britain.
 June 1 – Dr Richard Beeching takes office as chairman of the British Transport Commission and British Railways Board.
 June 17 – A Paris–Strasbourg train derails near Vitry-le-François; 24 are killed, 109 injured.

August events
 August 31 – Portland, Maine's Union Station is demolished to make room for a shopping plaza.

September events 
 September 23 – Maritime, Coal Railway and Power Company, in Nova Scotia, ceases operations.
 September 30 – Southern Pacific Railroad closes the Centerville (SP station).

October events 
 October 18 – General Motors Electro-Motive Division completes construction of the first GP30 diesel locomotive.
 October 26 – Two cars of a commuter train operated by Oita Traffic Company are involved in a mudslide during a massive rainstorm at Ōita, eastern Kyūshū, Japan, 31 killed, 36 injured. Most of the passengers are senior high school students.
 October 28 – Bangor and Aroostook Railroad ends passenger service.
 October – Work starts on demolition of Euston Arch in London.

November events 
 November 20 – Union Pacific 844 makes its first excursion run following retirement from regular revenue service on the Union Pacific Railroad.

Unknown date events
 Atlantic Coast Line's headquarters are moved from Wilmington, North Carolina, to Jacksonville, Florida.
 Construction is completed on Mexico's Chihuahua al Pacífico which linked the city of Chihuahua, Chihuahua, to the town of Los Mochis, Sinaloa, near the Pacific coast.
 Nationalization of rail transport in Paraguay.
 The first eight DC powered VL10 (i.e. Vladimir Lenin class) freight locomotives built at Tbilisi.
 The introduction in Sweden of the first SJ T43 locomotives opens the way for the phasing out of steam power on Swedish railways.
 The world's last Mallet locomotive is built in Japan, BB84 for the Indonesian State Railway Corporation's  gauge Atjeh Tramway on Sumatra.

Accidents

Births

Deaths

References 
 Rivanna Chapter, National Railway Historical Society (2005), This Month in Railroad History: October. Retrieved October 18, 2005.
 Rivanna Chapter, National Railway Historical Society (2005), This month in railroad history – November.  Retrieved November 20, 2005.